Air Vice-Marshal Ahmed Abd Ellatif of Alexandria, Egypt served as the Chairman of the Arab Scout Committee.

In 2009, he was awarded the 319th Bronze Wolf, the only distinction of the World Organization of the Scout Movement, awarded by the World Scout Committee for exceptional services to world Scouting.

He is married.

References

External links

Recipients of the Bronze Wolf Award
Year of birth missing
Scouting and Guiding in Egypt